Kaliště or Kalište may refer to::

Kaliště (Prague-East District), Czech Republic
Kaliště (Pelhřimov District), Czech Republic
Kaliště (Jihlava District), Czech Republic
Kalište, a village in Serbia
Kalište (Slovakia), a defunct municipality in Slovakia